Aquarama is a water park, located in Benicàssim, Castelló, Spain. The park has the eleventh-highest slide in the world named The Devil's Drop together with The Beast in Western Water Park.

References

Water parks in Spain
Province of Castellón
Tourist attractions in the Valencian Community